"Symphony in Blue" is a song written and recorded by Kate Bush and is the opening track to her second album, Lionheart. It was released as a single in Japan and Canada, and was the final single taken from Lionheart.

As with the "Wow" single elsewhere, the Lionheart track "Fullhouse" was used as the B-side for the Japanese single. Its picture sleeve was exclusive to this release. The Canadian release was pressed on blue vinyl.

Track listing
All tracks written and composed by Kate Bush.

7" vinyl – EMI (Japan)
 "Symphony in Blue" – 3:36
 "Fullhouse" – 3:14

7" vinyl - Harvest (Canada)
 "Symphony in Blue" – 3:36
 "Hammer Horror – 4:37

Personnel
Musicians
Stuart Elliot – drums, percussion
David Paton – bass 
Ian Bairnson – electric guitar
Kate Bush – vocals, harmony vocals, piano
Duncan Mackay – Fender Rhodes (Piano)

Production
Andrew Powell – producer
Kate Bush – assistant producer
Patrick Jauneaud – assistant engineer
David Katz – orchestra contractor
Jon Kelly – recording engineer
Nigel Walker – assistant engineer, mixing, mixing assistant

References

1979 singles
Kate Bush songs
Songs written by Kate Bush
Song recordings produced by Andrew Powell